Pietro Arnulfo (born 13 September 1988 in Genoa) is an Italian footballer who plays for Figline.

He moved his first football footsteps into Sampdoria's youth ranks, and made his Serie A debut as a substitute against Calcio Catania on 20 May 2007, which is also his only first team appearance so far.

In July 2008 Sampdoria confirmed to have loaned him out to Serie C2 team Cuoiocappiano.

References

Italian footballers
Footballers from Genoa
Serie A players
U.C. Sampdoria players
Association football forwards
1988 births
Living people